During the 1954–55 Syracuse Nationals season (their 6th), the National Basketball Association (NBA) was struggling financially and down to just 8 teams. Nationals owner Danny Biasone suggested that the league limit the amount of time taken for a shot. Biasone was upset with the stalling tactics of opposing teams. During the summer of 1954, Biasone had gotten together some of his pros and a group of high school players and timed them with a stopwatch. Most shots were taken within 12 seconds, Biasone discovered. Biasone calculated that a 24-second shot clock would allow at least 30 shots per quarter and assist in increasing scoring. The result would speed up a game that often ended with long periods of teams just holding the ball. Quickness and athletic ability became prized as they never had been before. Excessive fouling didn't disappear completely, but just about everyone concluded that the clock was good for the game. The shot clock was a success with the result that scoring was up 14 points per game league wide. In the 1st season of the shot clock, the Nats would take 1st place in the Eastern Division with a 43–29 record.

Offseason

NBA Draft

Roster

Regular season

Season standings

Record vs. opponents

Season schedule

Playoffs

|- align="center" bgcolor="#ccffcc" 
| 1
| March 22
| Boston
| W 110–100
| Red Kerr (27)
| —
| Paul Seymour (8)
| Onondaga War Memorial
| 1–0
|- align="center" bgcolor="#ccffcc" 
| 2
| March 24
| Boston
| W 116–110
| Dolph Schayes (22)
| Dolph Schayes (18)
| Paul Seymour (12)
| Onondaga War Memorial
| 2–0
|- align="center" bgcolor="#ffcccc" 
| 3
| March 26
| @ Boston
| L 97–100 (OT)
| Red Kerr (20)
| Dolph Schayes (14)
| George King (10)
| Boston Garden
| 2–1
|- align="center" bgcolor="#ccffcc" 
| 4
| March 27
| @ Boston
| W 110–94
| Dolph Schayes (28)
| Earl Lloyd (18)
| King, Seymour (8)
| Boston Garden
| 3–1
|-

|- align="center" bgcolor="#ccffcc" 
| 1
| March 31
| Fort Wayne
| W 86–82
| Red Rocha (19)
| —
| Onondaga War Memorial7,500
| 1–0
|- align="center" bgcolor="#ccffcc" 
| 2
| April 2
| Fort Wayne
| W 87–84
| Dolph Schayes (24)
| —
| Onondaga War Memorial5,845
| 2–0
|- align="center" bgcolor="#ffcccc" 
| 3
| April 3
| @ Fort Wayne
| L 89–96
| Rocha, Schayes (21)
| —
| Butler Fieldhouse3,200
| 2–1
|- align="center" bgcolor="#ffcccc" 
| 4
| April 5
| @ Fort Wayne
| L 102–109
| Dolph Schayes (28)
| —
| Butler Fieldhouse2,611
| 2–2
|- align="center" bgcolor="#ffcccc" 
| 5
| April 7
| @ Fort Wayne
| L 71–74
| Bill Kenville (15)
| —
| Butler Fieldhouse4,110
| 2–3
|- align="center" bgcolor="#ccffcc" 
| 6
| April 9
| Fort Wayne
| W 109–104
| Dolph Schayes (28)
| —
| Onondaga War Memorial4,997
| 3–3
|- align="center" bgcolor="#ccffcc" 
| 7
| April 10
| Fort Wayne
| W 92–91
| King, Kenville (15)
| Paul Seymour (8)
| Onondaga War Memorial6,697
| 4–3
|-

NBA Finals
In the Finals, the Nats would get off to a fast start; taking the first 2 games at home against the Fort Wayne Pistons. However, as home court shifted, the Pistons would spark back to life; taking all 3 games to take a 3–2 series lead. Heading back to Syracuse for Game 6 the Nats kept their Championship hopes alive by defeating the Pistons 109–104 to force a decisive game 7 at home. Game 7 would prove to be as tight as the entire series had played out to that point. As time started running out on the Pistons title hopes late in the 4th quarter of game 7 point guard George King sank a clutch free throw to give the Nats a 92–91 lead. King would then steal the inbound pass as time ticked away to clinch the NBA title for the Nationals.

Awards and honors
Dolph Schayes, All-NBA First Team
Paul Seymour, All-NBA Third Team

References

Nationals on Basketball Reference

Syracuse
NBA championship seasons
Philadelphia 76ers seasons